The Peace River is a large coal field located in the west of Canada in British Columbia. Peace River represents one of the largest coal reserve in Canada having estimated reserves of 4.9 billion tonnes of coal.

See also 
List of coalfields

References 

Coal in Canada